David Richard Hunt (born 1945) is a former English badminton international player and a former national doubles champion.

Biography
Hunt became the English National mixed doubles champion after winning the English National Badminton Championships in 1973 with Gillian Gilks. He was three times singles winner of the French Open in 1974, 1975 and 1977.

References 

English male badminton players
1945 births
Living people